CK Příbram Fany Gastro is a road cycling team founded in 2015 based in the Czech Republic. It held UCI Continental from 2015 to 2017 before switching to club status in 2018.

2018 team roster

References

UCI Continental Teams (Europe)
Cycling teams based in the Czech Republic
Cycling teams established in 2015